Wetaskiwin-Leduc was a provincial electoral district in Alberta mandated to return a single member to the Legislative Assembly of Alberta using the first past the post method of voting from 1971 to 1993.

History
Wetaskiwin-Leduc was formed from the abolished Wetaskiwin and Leduc electoral districts prior to the 1971 Alberta general election; both districts had existed continuously since 1905. Wetaskiwin-Leduc was abolished prior to the 1993 Alberta general election and its area formed parts of the Wetaskiwin-Camrose and Leduc electoral districts.

Wetaskiwin-Leduc is named for the Cities of Wetaskiwin, Alberta and Leduc, Alberta.

Members of the Legislative Assembly (MLAs)

Electoral history

1971 general election

1975 general election

1979 general election

1982 general election

1986 general election

1989 general election

See also
List of Alberta provincial electoral districts
Wetaskiwin, Alberta, a city in Alberta
Leduc, Alberta, a city in Alberta

References

Further reading

External links
Elections Alberta
The Legislative Assembly of Alberta

Former provincial electoral districts of Alberta